Harry Austin (17 April 1892 – 29 August 1968) was an English cricketer who played six first-class matches between the wars: four for Warwickshire in 1919, and two for Worcestershire in 1928. He had little success with either bat or ball, though the last of his three wickets (and his only wicket for Worcestershire) was that of Somerset captain and England Test player Jack White.

Notes

References
Statistical summary from CricketArchive
Lists of matches and detailed statistics from CricketArchive

1892 births
1968 deaths
People from Moseley
English cricketers
Warwickshire cricketers
Worcestershire cricketers
Cornwall cricketers